The Victoria's Secret Fashion Show is an annual fashion show sponsored by Victoria's Secret, a brand of lingerie and sleepwear. Victoria's Secret uses the show to promote and market its goods in high-profile settings. The show features some of the world's leading fashion models, such as current Victoria's Secret Angels Adriana Lima, Alessandra Ambrosio, Behati Prinsloo, Candice Swanepoel, Rosie Huntington-Whiteley Erin Heatherton, Lily Aldridge, and Chanel Iman. Miranda Kerr and Doutzen Kroes both missed this year's show due to their pregnancies.

The 15th fashion show featured some of the new Angels and also the returning Angels. There were special performances by Katy Perry & Akon.

Fashion show segments

Segment 1: Tough Love

Special Performance

Segment 2: Game On 
This segment was swapped in order of appearance with the third segment, Country Girls, in the edited TV version.

Segment 3: Country Girls 
This segment was swapped in order of appearance with the second segment, Game On, in the edited TV version.

Segment 4: Heavenly Bodies

Segment 5: Wild Things

Segment 6: PINK

Finale 

 Rosie Huntington-Whiteley and  Adriana Lima led the finale.

Index

External links 

 VSFS 2010 Gallery

Victoria's Secret
2010 in fashion